Gransden may refer to:

Gransden and Waresley Woods, managed as a nature reserve
Gransden Lodge Airfield, former wartime airfield 10 miles from Cambridge, England
Great Gransden, civil parish and village in the Huntingdonshire district of Cambridgeshire, England
Little Gransden, civil parish and village in South Cambridgeshire, England
Little Gransden Airfield (IATA: N/A, ICAO: EGMJ) is a licensed airfield located near the village of Little Gransden
K. W. Gransden, British scholar and poet